Craig Richards (born 30 April 1990) is an English professional boxer. He held the British light-heavyweight title from 2020 to 2021 and challenged for the WBA (Super) light-heavyweight in 2021.

Amateur career

Richards started his early boxing career at the South Norwood and Victory club, Charnwood Road, Crystal Palace, London, England. His trainer, Terry Smith, worked hard with Richards winning the Senior Novices.

Richards then left to box for the Lynn Athletic Boxing Club, where he met Terry Palmer, Richards would move with Terry to his new club in Bellingham Palmers Boxing Academy.

Professional career
Richards made his professional debut on 28 May 2015, scoring a first-round technical knockout (TKO) victory over a scheduled four rounds against James Child at the York Hall in London. He ended 2015 with a points decision (PTS) win against Scott Douglas in October.

He tallied up another five wins in 2016; Kieron Gray on PTS in January; a TKO over Richard Horton in June; Dalton Miller and Adam Jones by PTS in September; and a TKO over Bronislav Kubin in November.

On 17 March 2017, Richards fought for his first professional title, winning via ten-round unanimous decision (UD) against Alan Higgins at the York Hall to capture the Southern Area super-middleweight. He secured a PTS win against Rui Pavanito in July and a TKO win over Norbert Szekeres in October. Two days after his win over Szekeres, Callum Johnson pulled out of his British and Commonwealth light-heavyweight unification fight with Frank Buglioni. Richards was brought in as a last minute opponent at five days notice. The fight took place on 28 October at the Principality Stadium in Cardiff, Wales, and was aired live on Sky Sports Box Office as part of the undercard for Anthony Joshua vs. Carlos Takam. Richards suffered the first defeat of his professional career, losing by UD over twelve rounds. Two judges scored the bout 117–111 while the third scored it 116–113.

Richards came back with three stoppage wins in 2018; Ivan Stupalo in March; Bosko Misic in June; and Michal Ludwiczak in October. He began 2019 with a third-round TKO win against Alan Ball to capture the vacant WBA Intercontinental light-heavyweight title. The bout took place on 2 February at The O2 Arena in London. He had two more fights that year; a twelve-round UD victory against Andre Sterling in June and an eight-round draw against Chad Sugden in December.

It was announced in September 2020 that Richards would make a second attempt at the British title, this time against reigning champion Shakan Pitters on 14 November at the Fly By Nite Rehearsal Studios in Redditch. However, Pitters withdrew from the bout on medical advice after suffering an injury during training, with a new date being scheduled for 18 December at the same venue. Richards scored a knockdown in the fourth round, dropping the champion to the canvas with a right hook. Pitters made it back to his feet before the referee's count of ten to see out the remainder of the round on his feet. Richards scored a second knockdown in the ninth round, this time with a left hook. Pitters again made it back to his feet, but on unsteady legs, prompting referee Victor Loughlin to call a halt to the contest at 2 minutes and 42 seconds, awarding Richards the British title via ninth-round TKO.

In March 2021, it was announced that Richards would challenge for his first world title, facing reigning champion Dmitry Bivol for the WBA (Super) light-heavyweight title on 1 May at the AO Arena in Manchester. As part of the undercard for Joseph Parker vs. Derek Chisora. Richards would lose the bout via unanimous decision.

Professional boxing record

References

External links

Living people
1990 births
English male boxers
Boxers from Greater London
Super-middleweight boxers
Light-heavyweight boxers
British Boxing Board of Control champions